Five Forks is an unincorporated community in Patrick County, Virginia, United States.

References

Unincorporated communities in Patrick County, Virginia
Unincorporated communities in Virginia